= Min Jibalina =

Algerian war song

English: From our mountains
- من جبالنا
- Lyrics: Mohamed El Hadi Chérif, March 28, 1942
- Adopted: 1963

Min Jibalina is a war song which is one of the best-known of the Algerian War (1954–62). Created in 1931 by Mohamed Laïd Al-Khalifa, it received lyrics in July 1944. During the French control of Algeria, the song was banned by colonial authorities, who saw it as provocative. Despite that, the song remained popular, being widely used during the Algerian War.
